Mary Quin is the former chief executive at Callaghan Innovation, was an executive at Xerox in New York City, and a dual citizen of the United States and New Zealand. In 1998, while traveling in  Yemen her tourist group was kidnapped and four tourists were killed. After surviving being a hostage, she provided the FBI with information that allowed  British cleric, Abu Hamza, to be extradited to the United States to for his role in the kidnapping. She wrote a book about that affair: Kidnapped in Yemen: One Woman's Amazing Escape from Captivity (The Lyons Press).

The New Zealand Herald named her as one of two 2014 New Zealanders of the Year.

See also
List of kidnappings
List of solved missing person cases

References

1990s missing person cases
American business executives
American people taken hostage
American women business executives
Formerly missing people
Kidnapped businesspeople
Living people
Missing person cases in Yemen
New Zealand women chief executives
Year of birth missing (living people)